David Andrew Cripe (September 7, 1951 – June 9, 2010) was an American football coach.  He served as the head football coach at McPherson College in McPherson, Kansas for three seasons, from 1981 to 1983, compiling a record of 4–22–1.  Cripe also worked at the high school level as an assistant and head coach at various schools.

Head coaching record

References

External links
 

1951 births
2010 deaths
McPherson Bulldogs football coaches
High school football coaches in  Ohio
Sportspeople from Dayton, Ohio